(Roman Catholic) Diocese of Zamora may refer to the following Catholic jurisdictions, each with an episcopal see called Zamora :

 proper bishoprics
 Roman Catholic Diocese of Zamora in Spain, after which the others were named in colonial days
 Roman Catholic Diocese of Zamora in Mexico

 pre-diocesan see 
 Apostolic Vicariate of Zamora in Ecuador